Sihinaya Dige Enna (Come along the dream) is a 2012 Sri Lankan musical romantic film directed by Chandrarathne Mapitigama and produced by Samantha Ranasinghe. It stars Amila Abeysekara and Udari Warnakulasooriya in lead roles along with Sanath Gunathilake and Veena Jayakody. Music composed by Dinesh Subasinghe.

The film was released at Raja Cinema, Jaffna, which recorded as the first Sinhala film to be released in the region after 30 years. It is the 1175th Sri Lankan film in the Sinhala cinema.

Plot
The heroine of the story Ridma (Udari) is a violinist, and Sangeeth (Amila) is a guitarist. Their romance is set against ethnic issues between the Sinhalese and Tamil people of Sri Lanka. The Ridma's adopted father Ayeshmantha (Sanath) is a politician and mayor of a city in the hill country. The Sangeeth's mother, Sakunthala (Veena), is a rich and noble woman from Colombo. Sakunthala goes to the hill country city seeking revenge on her former lover who deserted her 25 years ago. When the mayor finds that his daughter is in love with Sakunthala's son, he makes every effort to break up their romance. Sakunthala also attempts to break up the young couple since she knows that the mayor is her son's father. However, the mayor's wife reveals a secret which allows the young lovers to reunite and teaches a lesson in ethnic harmony.

Cast
 Amila Abeysekara as Sangeeth
 Udari Warnakulasooriya as Ridma
 Sanath Gunathilake as Mayor Dushmantha Perera
 Veena Jayakody as Shanthi "Sakunthala" de Silva
 Nayana Kumari as Sunethra Elkaduwa
 Bandula Wijeweera as Music master Bandula
 Manel Wanaguru as Manel
 Rajitha Hiran as Hiran
 Saman Almeda as Saman
 Milinda Perera as Rohan
 Ravindra Mapitigama as Weerasinghe
 Rethika Kodithuwakku as Shaini
 Anura Srinath
 Jayasiri Weerathunge
 Chanchala Warnasooriya
 Himali Kapuge
 Ajith Dharmapriya
 Gihani Amarasena
 Suboodi Priyadarshani Karunarathne

Background 
Sihinaya Dige Enna was filmed in Bandarawela. Chandrarathna Mapitigama wrote the screenplay as well as directing the film. It was his fourth feature film, although he is a veteran director of many Sri Lankan teledramas. The film's premiere at the Raja Cinema in Jaffna marked the first time in 30 years that a film in Sinhalese with Tamil language subtitles was shown in the city.

Music 
The film's music director, Dinesh Subasinghe, had worked with director Chandrarathne Mapitigama on previous teledramas. He composed the score and also played the violin and guitar pieces which were mimed by the actor and actress playing the young lovers. The background music for the score, largely variations on the title song Sihinaya Dige Enna, was played by the Symphony Orchestra of Sri Lanka. The playback singers were Uresha Ravihari, Dumal Warnakulasuriya, and Kasun Primal. Uresha Ravihari sang the title song which has also been released as a single.

Soundtrack

See also
Cinema of Sri Lanka

References

External links 
Sihinaya Dige Enna at the IMDb
චන්ද්‍රරත්න මාපිටිගම සිහිනය දිගේ එන්න ගැන කතා කරයි

2010s Sinhala-language films
2012 films
2012 romance films
Sri Lankan romance films